"Nothing Lasts Forever" is a song by Australian alternative rock band, Jebediah. It was released on 18 February 2002 as the second single from the band's third studio album and reached number 50 on the Australian ARIA Singles Chart.

Music video
The music video for the song featured the band in the town of Margaret River, Australia, and concludes with the sun setting over the Indian Ocean.

Live performances
A live rendition of the song being performed at Fox Studios in Sydney, Australia, is available on the YouTube website.

Track listing

Charts

References

2002 singles
Jebediah songs
2001 songs
Murmur (record label) singles
Songs written by Kevin Mitchell (musician)
Song recordings produced by Magoo (Australian producer)